The Republican Herald is a daily newspaper serving Pottsville, Schuylkill County, Pennsylvania. The newspaper is owned by Times-Shamrock Communications.

History 
The Republican-Herald was founded in 1884 as The Daily Republican by Joseph Henry Zerbey. In 1995, J.H. Zerbey Newspapers, Inc., the parent company of the Pottsville Republican, purchased the 120-year-old Shenandoah Evening Herald, to form the Pottsville Republican & Evening Herald. Times Shamrock Communications purchased J.H. Zerbey Newspapers and subsequently the newspaper in 2003. In 2004, the newspaper became a morning newspaper, renamed the Republican & Herald. In 2009, the "&" was dropped from the cover title.

In 2005, the paper had an average daily circulation of 26,747.   As of 2019, newsstand prices were $1.00 for the daily edition and $2.00 for the combined Saturday/Sunday "Weekend Edition".

In 1979, writers Gilbert M. Gaul and Elliot G. Jaspin won a Pulitzer Prize for Local Investigative Specialized Reporting for stories on the destruction of the Blue Coal Company by men with ties to organized crime.

See also
List of newspapers in Pennsylvania

References

External links
The Republican - Herald

Republican and Herald, The
Pottsville, Pennsylvania